Michael Cook may refer to:

Sportspeople 
 Michael Cook (cricketer) (born 1939), English cricketer
 Michael Cook (rugby) (born 1962), Australian rugby union and rugby league player
 Mike Cook (baseball) (born 1963), retired baseball player
 Mike Cook (footballer) (born 1968), English former footballer
 Mike Cook (soccer), Canadian soccer player
 Micky Cook (footballer, born 1950), English football forward for Brentford
 Micky Cook (footballer, born 1951), English football right back for Colchester United

Others 
 Michael Cook (artist) (born 1968), Australian photographic artist
 Michael Cook (historian) (born 1940), English-Scottish historian and scholar of Islamic history
 Michael Cook (playwright) (1933–1994), Canadian playwright
 J. Michael Cook, former chairman and CEO of Deloitte & Touche

See also 
 Michael Cooke (disambiguation)